Julia Olehivna Vakulenko (born 10 July 1983) is a Ukraine-born female tennis player. She achieved her career-high ranking of No. 32 in November 2007.

In April 2008, Vakulenko renounced her Ukrainian citizenship, and then announced her decision to acquire the citizenship of Spain where she's lived for the last ten years.

Career
At the 2006 French Open, Vakulenko reached the third round.
At the 2006 Wimbledon Championships, she withdrew during the first round due to injury.

Julia became Kim Clijsters' last opponent in her professional career (before Clijsters' return in 2009). Vakulenko won 7–6(3), 6–3 in the second round of J&S Cup in Warsaw, Poland on 3 May 2007. This earned her the nickname "Kimmie Killer".

A week later, Julia defeated world No. 3, Amélie Mauresmo, at the German Open in Berlin, 2–6, 6–1, 6–2 (her career best), and then defeated Dinara Safina, 6–3, 5–7, 6–3, before retiring in the first set in the semifinals to eventual champion Ana Ivanovic due to an injury.

On 28 August 2007, in the first round of the US Open, Julia defeated ninth seed Daniela Hantuchová, 6–4, 3–6, 6–1. She eventually reached the fourth round, her best performance at a major, before falling to Ágnes Szávay.

At the final event of the season, the Bell Challenge held in Quebec City, Vakulenko reached the first WTA Tour final of her career. En route, she beat Rossana de los Ríos, home favourite Stéphanie Dubois, Olga Govortsova and Julie Ditty. In the final, she lost 4–6, 1–6 to three-time Grand Slam champion Lindsay Davenport, who was playing in only her third event since giving birth.

After changing of her citizenship from Ukraine to Spain in April 2008, she planned to play for Spain in the Fed Cup, but wasn't able to compete in the 2008 Olympics due to lack of time to be included in Spain's application.

WTA career finals

Singles: 1 (1 runner-up)

ITF finals

Singles (7–6)

Doubles (0–1)

Singles performance timeline

1 Doha became a Tier I tournament in 2008, replacing San Diego and Zürich

Head-to-head record against other players

Dinara Safina 1–1
 Jelena Kostanić 1–0
 Svetlana Kuznetsova 
 Flavia Pennetta 2–1
 Daniela Hantuchová 1–1
 Elena Dementieva 0–1
 Patty Schnyder  
 Francesca Schiavone 
 Anna Chakvetadze 1–0
Maria Sharapova 0–1
 Ai Sugiyama 1–0
Jelena Janković 1–1
Amélie Mauresmo 1–1
Kim Clijsters 1–1
Caroline Wozniacki 0–1
 Anna Kournikova 0–1
Lindsay Davenport 0–1 
Ana Ivanovic 0–1
Justine Henin 0–1
Serena Williams 0–1
 Petra Kvitová 0–1
 Mary Pierce 0–1
 Kimiko Date-Krumm 
 Paola Suárez 
 Alicia Molik 
 Marion Bartoli 0–1

Top 10 wins

References

External links

 

1983 births
Living people
Spanish female tennis players
Ukrainian female tennis players
Ukrainian expatriates in Spain
Ukrainian emigrants to Spain
Naturalised citizens of Spain
People from Yalta
Spanish people of Ukrainian descent
Ukrainian people of Spanish descent